Friedrich "Fritz" Gesztesy (born 5 November 1953 in Austria) is a well-known Austrian-American mathematical physicist and Professor of Mathematics at Baylor University, known for his important contributions in spectral theory, functional analysis, nonrelativistic quantum mechanics (particularly, Schrödinger operators), ordinary and partial differential operators, and completely integrable systems (soliton equations). He has authored more than 270 publications on mathematics and physics.

Career

After studying physics at the University of Graz, he continued with his PhD in theoretical physics. The title of his dissertation 1976 with Heimo Latal and Ludwig Streit was Renormalization, Nelson's symmetry and energy densities in a field theory with quadratic interaction. After working at the Institut for Theoretical Physics of the University of Graz (1977–82) and several stays abroad at the Bielefeld University (Alexander von Humboldt Scholarship 1980–81 and 1983–84) and at the California Institute of Technology (Max Kade Scholarship 1987–88) he was appointed to Professor at the University of Missouri in 1988 and as Houchins Distinguished Professor in 2002. In 2016 he joined the faculty of Baylor University as Storm Professor of Mathematics.

In 1983 he got the Austrian Theodor Körner Award in Natural Sciences, in 1987 the Ludwig Boltzmann Prize of the Austrian Physical Society. In 2002 he was elected to the Royal Norwegian Society of Sciences and Letters. In 2013 he became a Fellow of the American Mathematical Society.

Among his students are Gerald Teschl, Karl Unterkofler, and Maxim Zinchenko.

Selected publications
with Sergio Albeverio, Raphael Høegh-Krohn and Helge Holden: " Solvable Models in Quantum Mechanics", 2nd edition, AMS-Chelsea Series, Amer. Math. Soc., 2005
with Helge Holden: Soliton Equations and their Algebro-Geometric Solutions, Bd.1 (1+1 dimensional continuous models), Cambridge Studies in Advanced Mathematics Bd.79, Cambridge University Press 2003
with Helge Holden, Johanna Michor, and Gerald Teschl: Soliton Equations and their Algebro-Geometric Solutions, Bd.2 (1+1 dimensional discrete models), Cambridge Studies in Advanced Mathematics Bd.114, Cambridge University Press 2008
with Barry Simon, The xi function, Acta Math. 176 (1996), 49–71
with Rudi Weikard, Picard potentials and Hill's equation on a torus, Acta Math. 176 (1996), 73–107
with Rudi Weikard, A characterization of all elliptic algebro-geometric solutions of the AKNS hierarchy, Acta Math. 181 (1998), 63–108
with Barry Simon, A new approach to inverse spectral theory. II. General real potentials and the connection to the spectral measure, Ann. of Math. 2 152 (2000), 593–643

Literature
 Spectral Analysis, Differential Equations and Mathematical Physics: A Festschrift in Honor of Fritz Gesztesy's 60th Birthday, H. Holden, B. Simon and G. Teschl (eds), Proceedings of Symposia in Pure Mathematics 87, Amer. Math. Soc., 2013 (Preface)

References

External links
Official Webpage

1953 births
Living people
20th-century American mathematicians
21st-century American mathematicians
Austrian mathematicians
University of Missouri faculty
University of Missouri physicists
Baylor University faculty
Members of the Norwegian Academy of Science and Letters
Fellows of the American Mathematical Society
Mathematicians from Missouri